Cookie-cutter campaigns are political campaigns, engineered by political consultants who run virtually identical campaigns in different jurisdictions. The typical hallmarks of such a campaign are direct mail advertisements using identical layouts and stock photographs. The term is typically used derisively, often by local political activists frustrated with the lack of attention to local public issues and lack of understanding of local political and governmental nuances.

The rise of cookie-cutter campaigns is due in large measure to the rise of political consulting. Where political consultants once were limited mostly to national and statewide elections, they are now employed down to the levels of city council and school board elections. Taking on many clients, they employ standardized materials and strategies for different campaigns.

References

Election campaign terminology